Subhan Bakhsh was son of Nawab Hasan Ali Khan Bahadur, and succeeded him as Nawab of Masulipatam in India.

Official name
His official name was Rustam Jah, Nawab..Ali Khan Bahadur [Subhan Bakhsh].

Titles held

See also
Nawab of Carnatic
Nawab of Banganapalle

1799 deaths
Nawabs of India
Year of birth unknown